Lost Kisses is a 2010 Italian comedy-drama film directed by Roberta Torre and based on a story by Torre.

Plot
When the head of her town's Virgin Mary statue goes missing, 13-year-old Manuela (Carla Marchese) claims that Mary came to her in a dream and told her where it could be found. After the missing piece of the statue is located, Manuela gains a reputation as a miracle worker.

Cast
 Carla Marchese as Manuela
 Donatella Finocchiaro as Rita
 Piera Degli Esposti as Viola
 Pino Micol as Don Livio
 Giuseppe Fiorello as Giulio

Awards and nominations
 Brian Award at the 67th Venice International Film Festival.

References

External links
 
 
 

2010 films
2010 comedy-drama films
Italian comedy-drama films
2010s Italian-language films
Films set in Sicily
Films shot in Italy
Italian independent films
2010 independent films
2010s Italian films